The 2018 BRDC British Formula 3 Championship was a motor racing championship for open wheel, formula racing cars held across England, with one round in Belgium. The 2018 season was the third organised by the British Racing Drivers' Club in the United Kingdom. The championship featured a mix of professional motor racing teams and privately funded drivers, and also featured the 2-litre 230-bhp Tatuus-Cosworth single seat race car in the main series. The season commenced at Oulton Park on 31 March and ended on 14 October at Silverstone Circuit, after eight triple header events for a total of twenty-four races.

Teams and drivers
All teams were British-registered.

Race calendar and results 

The calendar was revealed on 21 November 2017. The series supported British GT at all events, excluding the finale at Silverstone Circuit. It had one overseas round at Spa-Francorchamps in Belgium.

Championship standings
Scoring system

Points were awarded to the top 20 classified finishers in races one and three, with the second race awarding points to only the top 15. Race two, which reversed the order of the race one finishers, providing they set a lap time within 103% of the fastest driver, will be awarded extra points for positions gained from drivers' respective starting positions.

Notes
1 2 3 refers to positions gained and thus extra points earned during race two.

Drivers' championship

Footnotes

References

External links
 

BRDC British Formula 3 Championship seasons
Brdc Formula 3
Brdc Formula 3
BRDC F3